Logan Tipene Rogerson (born 28 May 1998) is a New Zealand professional footballer who plays for Finnish Premier League club FC Haka as a winger. He has been capped by the New Zealand national football team.

Career
After beginning his senior career with the now-defunct Wanderers SC in the ASB Premiership Rogerson signed his first professional contract, a three-year deal with A-League club Wellington Phoenix in September 2015.

After not hearing from the Wellington Phoenix about a contract extension, Rogerson left the club and then signed a two-year deal with Carl Zeiss Jena who play in the German 3. Liga.

After returning to New Zealand following an unsuccessful spell in Germany where a serious knee injury cut his season short, Rogerson signed for ISPS Handa champions Auckland City on the 23rd in October 2019. Rogerson helped lead Auckland City to a second successive ISPS Handa title in his first season at the club, proving to be an important signing for City across the course of the season. On the 15th of March 2021, after another outstanding ISPS Handa season in 20/21 in which he scored eight times and registered six assists. Rogerson signed a contract with 20/21 Finnish Champions HJK Helsinki.

International career
Rogerson has represented New Zealand at U17, U23, and at full senior international level. He was part of the New Zealand national under-23 football team that participated in the 2015 Pacific Games, which doubled as qualification for the Football at the 2016 Summer Olympics. It was in this tournament, against New Caledonia that he scored a hat-trick in New Zealand's 5–0 win.

In November 2015 Rogerson made his full New Zealand debut came in a friendly against Oman, coming off the bench for the final 23 minutes in New Zealand's 1–0 win.

Career statistics

Honours

Country
New Zealand
 OFC Nations Cup: 2016
 Pacific Games: 2019
 OFC U-20 Championship: 2016
 OFC U-17 Championship: 2015

Individual
 OFC U-17 Championship Golden Ball: 2015

References

External links

Living people
1998 births
New Zealand Māori sportspeople
Association football midfielders
New Zealand association footballers
New Zealand international footballers
Association footballers from Wellington City
Wellington Phoenix FC players
FC Carl Zeiss Jena players
Auckland City FC players
FC Haka players
A-League Men players
New Zealand Football Championship players
3. Liga players
Veikkausliiga players
Expatriate footballers in Germany
New Zealand expatriate sportspeople in Germany
Expatriate footballers in Finland
New Zealand expatriate sportspeople in Finland
2016 OFC Nations Cup players